Dascylium or Daskylion  or Daskyleion (Δασκυλεῖον) was a town in the border region of ancient Aeolis and ancient Phrygia, mentioned by Stephanus of Byzantium.

Its site is unlocated.

References

Populated places in ancient Aeolis
Populated places in Phrygia
Former populated places in Turkey